Chain of Ponds may refer to.

Chain of Ponds, South Australia, a locality
Chain of Ponds, Maine, a township 
Chain of Ponds Inn, a heritage listed building in Australia

See also
Chain (disambiguation)